Anđelija Rogić (born 1994 in Užice, Serbia) is a Serbian beauty queen who represented Serbia in the Miss World 2017 contest which was held in Sanya, China. She is studying pedagogy at Belgrade University, works as a fashion model and performs with a folklore dance group.  As Miss Serbia, Rogić performed a dance number in the talent portion of the show.

References

1994 births
Living people
Serbian women
Miss World 2017 delegates
21st-century Serbian women
Serbian female models
Miss Serbia winners
Serbian beauty pageant winners